Los Cacicazgos is a district or neighborhood in the city of Santo Domingo, the capital of the Dominican Republic. It is one of the richest neighborhoods in Dominican Republic and the wealthiest in the city of Santo Domingo. The district is named after the Native Taino Chiefdoms of Hispaniola. Los Cacicazgos is in particular populated by individuals from the upper class.

The district has the lowest poverty rate in the city surpassing the neighborhood of Piantini. It is the city's most opulent borough; the Anacaona Avenue has the most expensive price per m2 in the country. Its limits are: to the north, Renacimiento; to the east, Mirador Sur park; to the south, South Vantage Point Park and beyond it, Buenos Aires; to the west, Herrera (in the Province of Santo Domingo). The Carol Morgan School is one of the best school in DR

Sources 
Distrito Nacional sectors

Populated places in Santo Domingo